60 Minute Makeover is a British home interior design television programme broadcast on ITV, and later by Quest Red. In 2013, the show's name changed to reflect the change in presenter to Peter Andre.

Format
The challenge was to redecorate and makeover a number of rooms in a house in 60 minutes. The house owner is usually nominated by a relative or friend for a secret visit by the 60 Minute Makeover team who remodel their house whilst they are away.  On returning, the owners are given a tour of their remodelled rooms by the host. The cost of the makeover is stated at the end of each show. The house owner earning the makeover is often in need of help due to illness or difficult times.

Presenters and designers

Presenters
Claire Sweeney (2004–2006)
Terri Dwyer (2007–2009)
Linda Barker (2010)
Catherine Gee (2011–2012)
Peter Andre (2013–2014, 2018)

Claire Sweeney was the original host, presenting the programme for several series before Terri Dwyer took over. In series 7, 60 Minute Makeover was fronted and timed by the designer who also acted as presenter with and narration provided by Alex Hall, Lee Williams and Catherine Gee. From series 7 to 12, the number of rooms made over has been reduced from 4 to 3, to cut production costs.

In spring 2011, the programme returned to its original format and was given a new look with Catherine Gee as the new host for series 8 with the designers once again concentrating on remodeling the rooms as prior to series 7. The team decorated three rooms per show. Gee also provided the narration for the show for these two series.

In 2013, singer and reality TV star Peter Andre took over as the main presenter. The show was rebranded as Peter Andre's 60 Minute Makeover, beginning on 11 November 2013.

Designers
 John Amabile
 Linda Barker
 Ann Hazell
 Ben Hillman
 Leah Hughes
 Julia Kendell
 Carl Machin
 Richard Randall
 Kathryn Rayward
 Sophie Robinson
 Hannah Sandling
 Derek Taylor
 Scott Waldron

Transmissions

Awards

International broadcasts

References

2004 British television series debuts
2018 British television series endings
2000s British reality television series
2010s British reality television series
English-language television shows
ITV reality television shows
Makeover reality television series
Television series by ITV Studios